Leopold Kramer (29 September 1869 – 29 October 1942) was an Austrian stage and film actor.

Selected filmography
 The Eye of the Buddha (1919)
 Ungarische Rhapsodie (1928)
 Frauenarzt Dr. Schäfer (1928)
 Die geheime Macht (1928)
 Sajenko the Soviet (1928)
 The Woman on the Rack (1928)
 Honour Thy Mother (1928)
 Hungarian Rhapsody (1928)
 Was kostet Liebe? (1929)
 Money on the Street (1930)
 The Ringer (1932)
 Ekstase (1933)
 Two Good Comrades (1933)
 The Racokzi March (1933)
 Rakoczy-Marsch (1935)

Bibliography
 Jung, Uli & Schatzberg, Walter. Beyond Caligari: The Films of Robert Wiene. Berghahn Books, 1999.

External links

1869 births
1942 deaths
Austrian male film actors
Austrian male stage actors
Austrian male silent film actors
Male actors from Prague
Jewish Austrian male actors
20th-century Austrian male actors